Mercedes-Benz LP "cubic" cabin trucks were a series of cab-over-engine trucks first shown in 1963. They are most commonly referred to as the "Kubische Kabine" in German, referring to the squared-off appearance of the cabin. "LP" was also used on the cab-over versions of the preceding range of Mercedes-Benz trucks. The heavy- and medium-duty models had been discontinued by 1975 as the Mercedes-Benz NG range took over, while the lighter portion of the range was only replaced in 1984, by the new LK (Leichte Klasse, "light class"). Mercedes-Benz LP trucks also served as basis for Tata Motors cowl trucks.

History
The new LP range first appeared in 1963, along with a new naming system for Mercedes-Benz trucks as well as a new engine generation. Common for all variants were strong mechanics but an unfortunate reputation for rusting quickly. Some of the early trucks equipped with the new engines also suffered problems, but these were soon rectified. The cabin was designed to maximize interior space, with a low engine hump, and with large windows all around.

The naming of the trucks followed Mercedes-Benz' new naming strategy: the leading one or two digits signified the gross vehicle weight rating, with the last two digits representing the maximum power in tens of horsepowers (rounded to suit and with a leading zero if necessary). The LP range proved a strong seller, with an increase of German sales for Mercedes-Benz in the heavy truck segment of 153 per cent between 1965 and 1973.

Light duty
These LPs can most easily be distinguished by their low-line grilles, with headlights mounted inside. As with all of the Cubic cabs, they did not have a tilting cabin, both to save costs and to make it more safe in crashes. A series of hatches and doors were to provide access, but the trucks were complicated to service. Only a short daycab was on offer, although independent bodybuilders were at hand to provide any other layouts. The first version introduced was the LP 608, equipped with the  OM 314 diesel engine. There was also a  version, as well as  ones. In 1969 nine-tonners appeared, fitted with the six-cylinder OM 352 engine with either . The LP 608 was also the first truck to leave the production line in Daimler-Benz newly constructed plant in Wörth.

In 1977 the light range was thoroughly modernized, with a smoothed out cabin and a new grille. The headlights were now mounted below the body, in the front bumper. A version with an air-sprung rear axle was also added. The cabin remained fixed, in a segment where most competitors had moved on to tilting cabs. The light portion of the range outlived its heavier counterparts, remaining in production until 1984.

Medium duty

A different door arrangement was shared with the heaviest part of the range, while the grille was taller. The headlamps were mounted in the lower half of the grille. Introduced in 1965, it was fully replaced by the Mercedes-Benz NG in 1976. In 1965 a  longer cabin with room for two berths was also introduced. The non-tilting cabin required a large number of hatches and doors for access to the mechanical parts, which earned the model the less than flattering nickname "Advent Calendar."

When the heavier range was facelifted in 1970, the middleweights received mechanical upgrades and new weight ratings, but the appearance remained mostly the same.

Heavy duty
The heavy-duty models were the first to be introduced, in late 1963. Their cabin is similar to that of the later middleweight trucks, although the oval headlamps were mounted in the bumper beneath the body. They were fairly spartanly equipped, in particular the absence of a suspended seat. Mercedes-Benz countered with a suspended cabin, but this was often not enough to provide driver comfort in practice. Much of the technology was adapted from the preceding L/LP series, including the  OM 326 diesel straight-six. In 1964 this was replaced with the all-new  OM 346 direct injection diesel, an engine that ran smoother and was more durable (after some early problems).

From 1 January 1972, the minimum power requirement increased to 8 PS/tonne (max 280 lb/hp). Mercedes-Benz responded with a new generation of diesel engines in a V-layout. These, however, required a tilting cabin and thus the heavy trucks were finally thus equipped. A  V10 OM 403 was enough for the heaviest loads, while a  V8 was perfect for the  category. The 1970 LP-series received new doors that went down deeper, eliminating the exposed steps and many of the various hatches. The roof was higher, and the front turn signals moved outwards so as to be visible from the sides of the truck. The smaller versions continued with the old cab. The heaviest models featured a lot of parts that were developed for the succeeding New Generation trucks, and are sometimes called the "Between Generation" (Zwischen-Generation). Towards the end of production of the V10 trucks, they received newly developed planetary axles as the earlier designs could not quite handle the V10's torque.

Engines

References

External links 

LP cubic truck
Cab over vehicles
Trucks of Germany
Vehicles introduced in 1963